Louis-Joseph Masquelier or Masquelier the Elder (21 February 1741 – 26 May 1811) was a French draughtsman and engraver. Born in Cysoing near Lille in northern France, he died in Paris. He was very close to François-Denis Née, with whom he studied under Jacques-Philippe Le Bas. His son Claude-Louis Masquelier was also an engraver and lithographer.

Sources

1741 births
1811 deaths
18th-century French engravers
19th-century French engravers
19th-century French male artists
People from Nord (French department)
18th-century French male artists